Robert Wood Johnson IV (born April 12, 1947) is an American businessman who was the United States ambassador to the United Kingdom from 2017 to 2021. He is a great-grandson of Robert Wood Johnson I, and a heir to the Johnson & Johnson pharmaceutical fortune. In 2000 he purchased the New York Jets football team and is currently the Jets co-owner alongside his brother, Christopher Johnson.

A longtime Republican Party donor, Johnson was a supporter of Donald Trump's presidential campaign, and was appointed by Trump to the post of United States Ambassador to the United Kingdom. During his tenure he oversaw Britain’s exit from the EU and the relocation of the United States embassy in London.

Early life and education
Johnson was born in New Brunswick, New Jersey, the son of Betty Johnson (née Wold) and Robert Wood Johnson III, and the great-grandson of Robert Wood Johnson I who founded the Johnson & Johnson pharmaceutical company. He grew up with four siblings, Keith Johnson, Billy Johnson, Elizabeth "Libet" Johnson, and Christopher Wold Johnson, in northern New Jersey, and attended the Millbrook School. He graduated from the University of Arizona and worked summer jobs at Johnson & Johnson.

Career

The Johnson Company, Inc 
Johnson was the chairman and chief executive of The Johnson Company, Inc., a private investment firm. In August 2006, Johnson was asked to testify before the Senate's Permanent Subcommittee on Investigations regarding his participation in a tax avoidance scheme. A Senate report said that Johnson, along with others, was able to buy, for relatively small fees, roughly $2 billion in capital losses that they used to erase taxable gains they garnered from stock sales. The U.S. Treasury lost an estimated $300 million in revenue as a result. In a statement, Johnson said he had been advised by his lawyers in 2000 that the transaction "was consistent with the Tax Code." After the Internal Revenue Service challenged that view in 2003, Johnson in 2006 settled with the IRS and agreed to pay 100 percent of the tax due plus interest.

Johnson was the committee president of the Pre-Commissioning Unit for the  ship .

Sports
In January 2000, Johnson purchased the New York Jets for $635 million, at the time the third-highest price for a professional sports team and the highest for a New York professional sports team. Johnson outbid the offer of $612 million placed by Charles Dolan, the owner of the Madison Square Garden, New York Knicks, and New York Rangers. Forbes valued the team at $3.2 billion as of September 2019.

After buying the Jets, Johnson announced plans to move them to the proposed West Side Stadium in Manhattan. However, after the project's defeat in 2005, Johnson announced the Jets would move to a new Meadowlands Stadium as an equal partner with the Giants. The new stadium opened on April 10, 2010, with naming rights being acquired by MetLife.

Johnson was a member of the eight-man NFL search committee to choose a successor to Paul Tagliabue as NFL commissioner.

Johnson's brother Christopher took over as CEO and acting owner in 2017, while Johnson was U.S. ambassador to the United Kingdom. In 2021, after returning to the U.S., Woody Johnson returned as Jets chairman, while Christopher Johnson became vice-chairman.

In June 2021, Johnson stated his excitement to work with coach Robert Saleh and general manager Joe Douglas, whom he praised. He expressed optimism about putting together a winning team in 2021, after the Jets had experienced setbacks during his absence.

In March 2022, Johnson made a £2 billion bid to purchase Chelsea F.C. from sanctioned billionaire Roman Abramovich. He became a fan of the football team while serving as US Ambassador to the United Kingdom. His knowledge of London and sports management was expected to give him an edge over Saudi Media Group, another party interested in buying the team. On March 25, it was reported that he was no longer in the bidding for Chelsea F.C.

Net worth
Johnson is the billionaire heir to the Johnson & Johnson fortune. His net worth was estimated at $5.7 billion in March 2022.

Political activities
Johnson has given more than $1 million to various Republican candidates and committees. Between 1997 and 1998, he donated $130,000 to the Republican Party, along with donating $22,583 to George W. Bush's 1998 gubernatorial re-election campaign of Texas. He was later a major New York fund-raiser for Bush's 2000 presidential campaign.

In May 2008, he orchestrated a fundraiser in New York City that brought in $7 million in a single evening for John McCain's presidential campaign, by far the largest amount collected up to that point by a campaign that had been struggling to raise money. Johnson also provided significant funding to 2008 Republican National Convention host committee; from a $10 million shortfall, Johnson contributed personally and solicited friends to assist in covering the convention deficit. In 2011, Johnson endorsed former Massachusetts Governor Mitt Romney in the 2012 Republican presidential primaries. In September 2013, Johnson hosted a fundraiser for the Republican National Committee (RNC) at his home in New York City.

By 2016, Johnson had known Donald Trump for about 30 years, with the two men having social connections. Nevertheless, in the 2016 Republican presidential primaries, Johnson initially endorsed Jeb Bush over Trump. In June 2015, Johnson was named the national finance chairman for Bush's campaign. On several occasions, Trump singled out Johnson in a speech attacking Bush for accepting "special interest" money from donors. In May 2016, after Trump became the presumptive nominee, Johnson endorsed Trump for president. He met with Trump at Trump Tower and was named one of the RNC's six finance vice chairmen, responsible for an effort to raise $1 billion on behalf of Trump's campaign.

Johnson had by August 2019 donated $1.5 million to Trump's campaign and inaugural committee. In February 2020, Johnson gave $575,000 to a fundraising committee for Trump's 2020 re-election campaign, and $355,000 to the RNC. In May 2020, he gave $1 million to America First Action, Inc., a pro-Trump super PAC.

On January 8, 2021, Johnson released a statement condemning the 2021 United States Capitol attack, and calling it a "dark day" in US history.

United States Ambassador

On January 19, 2017, President-elect Donald Trump announced that he planned to nominate Johnson to become United States Ambassador to the United Kingdom. On June 22, 2017, Trump nominated Johnson for the position. Prior to becoming ambassador, he had no diplomatic experience.

Following a hearing in the Senate Judiciary Committee, Johnson was confirmed by the U.S. Senate on August 3, 2017, by voice vote. He was sworn in by Vice President Mike Pence on August 21, 2017, in the Oval Office. Johnson presented his credentials to Queen Elizabeth II on November 8, 2017.

In 2018, Johnson oversaw the relocation of the United States Embassy in London from Grosvenor Square, where it had been since 1938, to a new location in Nine Elms.

Brexit 
During Johnson's tenure, Britain withdrew from the EU. Johnson advocated for a bilateral US-UK trade deal post-Brexit, in line with President Trump's hopes during that time. Johnson had a private dinner with Queen Elizabeth II at Winfield House on March 14, 2019, just two days after British Parliament rejected Theresa May's Brexit plan.

In June 2019, he further stated that a post-Brexit deal between the US and the UK would cover "all things that are traded", including the National Health Service and agricultural sector. In January 2020, Johnson stated that the US was never interested in the NHS, but reiterated American interest in a free-trade deal with the UK.

Agriculture
Johnson advocated for closer agricultural trade between the US and UK, and the deregulation of US food exports to Britain. In March 2019, Johnson wrote an article in the Daily Telegraph saying that chlorinated chicken was a "public safety no-brainer" and that health fears over hormone-fed beef were "myths". This came after he urged the UK to open up to the US agriculture market after the British exit from the European Union and ignore the "smear campaign" of those with "their own protectionist agenda". Johnson was criticized by several British agriculture standard boards, such as the Red Tractor Assurance whose CEO, Jim Moseley stated the UK's food standards were "now under threat from ... the United States food lobby". Minette Batters, president of the UK National Farmers Union, agreed with Johnson's claims that chlorine-rinsed chicken was safe for consumption, but stated that factors such as animal welfare and environmental protection also had to be considered. Batters commented that accepting US agricultural products produced in ways that would be illegal in the UK would "put British producers out of business". The US National Farmers Union maintained that US methods of meat production were "safe", describing criticism as "fear-mongering".

Huawei 
Johnson advised the UK government to ban Huawei from being used in the nation's 5G networks after departing Prime Minister Theresa May approved the company in early 2019. Johnson said that Huawei could represent an economic and security risk, comparing it to "letting a kleptomaniac move into your house." In 2020, after Britain decided to ban Huawei from its 5G mobile networks, Johnson welcomed the decision as a victory for human rights and fair trading practices.

Allegations of "inappropriate or insensitive comments" to embassy staff 
In 2020, Johnson was investigated by the State Department inspector general over allegations that he made sexist and racist comments to embassy staff. He had been reported to have held official meetings at mens-only clubs in London, which meant that female staff members would not be able to attend. According to the New York Times, half a dozen current and former embassy employees said that Johnson made staff members uncomfortable by making remarks about their appearances or race. One diplomat said he made disparaging remarks about Black History Month.

The inspector general's report, issued in August 2020, found that Johnson "sometimes made inappropriate or insensitive comments on topics generally considered Equal Employment Opportunity (EEO)-sensitive, such as religion, sex, or color" that could "create an offensive working environment" and violate EEO (antidiscrimination) laws. The report also found morale problems at the embassy attributable to Johnson's conduct, including his suggestions that embassy employees were disloyal to Trump, questioning of embassy staff's motives, and suggestions that he would remove embassy staff from their jobs for raising concerns. The report found that "This caused staff to grow wary of providing him with their best judgment." The inspector general's office recommended that the State Department's Bureau of European and Eurasian Affairs and Office of Civil Rights coordinate an investigation into Johnson's conduct, "and based on the results of the review, take appropriate action"; however, the department's leadership indicated that they would not open any "formal assessment" and indicated that Johnson had instead watched a State Department video on workplace harassment. Johnson denied that he had "treated employees with disrespect or discriminated in any way" and denied making any inappropriate comments.

In January 2021, an investigation by the State Department's Office of Civil Rights found that the allegations that Johnson had made inappropriate comments about race and gender were "unsubstantiated".

British Open at Trump Turnberry 
In February 2018, Johnson as ambassador sought to have the lucrative British Open golf tournament moved to Trump's Turnberry Golf Resort in Scotland, raising the idea with Secretary of State for Scotland David Mundell. The New York Times reported, and the former deputy chief of mission at the U.S. embassy in London Lewis Lukens later confirmed, that Trump had asked Johnson to seek British government influence in obtaining the Open for Turnberry. At the time Lukens warned Johnson not to raise the question with the UK government, saying that an attempt to further the president's personal financial interests in this way would be unethical and probably illegal. Johnson did so anyway, unsuccessfully.

In a statement, the British government said that Johnson "made no request of Mr. Mundell regarding the British Open or any other sporting event"; the statement did not say whether Johnson had raised the subject of Turnberry. Johnson did not deny the episode, saying only that he complied with "the ethical rules and requirements of my office"; Trump denied that he had ever spoken to Johnson "about Turnberry." Lukens documented his concerns to State Department officials. Johnson forced out Lukens several months later, before the scheduled end of his tenure in London. The report that Johnson used his position as ambassador to promote the president's personal business interests sparked an inquiry by the State Department inspector general's office. In an interview in August 2020, Lukens said that the inspector general's report had halted without a public report being issued, which he considered unusual.

Personal life

In 1977, Johnson married former fashion model Nancy Sale Johnson. They had three children before divorcing in 2001. In early 2010, daughter Casey Johnson died of diabetic ketoacidosis. He started a research foundation, the Alliance for Lupus Research, after his daughter Jaime was found to have lupus.

In 2009, Johnson married Suzanne Ircha Johnson, a former actress and equities managing director at Sandler O'Neill & Partners. They have two children. Suzanne's father emigrated from Ternopil, Ukraine after World War II, and her mother was a first-generation Ukrainian American. She grew up in a Ukrainian neighbourhood in Greenwich Village.

Johnson has homes in Bedminster Township, New Jersey, and Manhattan, New York City. Johnson has resided in Palm Beach, Florida, since 2020.

Philanthropy 
Johnson is known for philanthropic contributions to medical research, especially for diabetes and lupus, two diseases affecting his family members. Johnson also lobbied to increase federal funding for research on the two conditions. Johnson is also a trustee of the Robert Wood Johnson Jr. Charitable Trust and was a trustee of the Robert Wood Johnson Foundation.

Johnson was the chairman of the Juvenile Diabetes Foundation. He and his wife became involved with diabetes charities after his daughter Casey was diagnosed with diabetes in 1988. In 1994, he co-wrote the book Managing Your Child's Diabetes with his wife Nancy, and Casey. As of 2000, he had donated $12 million to the foundation. Johnson was a chairman on the Council on Foreign Relations, and successfully lobbied Congress to approve a five-year, $750 million package for funding diabetes research in 2002.

Casey died of diabetic ketoacidosis in January 2010. In a 2012 op-ed in The Wall Street Journal, Johnson urged Congress to approve long-term funding for the Special Diabetes Program.

Johnson is the founding chairman of the Alliance for Lupus Research (ALR). He founded the organization in 1999 after his daughter Jaime was diagnosed with lupus, and he realized that there was a lack of research in that area.

Ukraine 
During the ongoing 2022 Russian invasion of Ukraine, Johnson and his wife Suzanne, who comes from a Ukrainian background, have organized aid efforts for Ukraine. Their family visited Poland, which is the primary destination for Ukrainian refugees displaced by the crisis. While in Poland, they made visits to community centres, shelters and orphanages housing Ukrainian refugees. In an article for The Telegraph, Johnson has urged the United States and the United Kingdom to take action and assist Ukraine.

In April 2022, the Jets pledged a $1 million donation to Ukraine, to be distributed in monthly instalments of $100,000 to various Ukrainian organizations. The first organization to receive money from the fund was Plast Scouting USA, a Ukrainian scouting organization working to provide first aid and medical supplies during the war. United24, a fundraising initiative created by Ukrainian president Volodymyr Zelenskyy, was another beneficiary. In August 2022, the Jets announced plans to raise awareness for Ukraine's humanitarian crisis during their Week 3 match against the Cincinnati Bengals on September 25, including adding Ukrainian flag decals to their helmets. The Jets will also paint the Ukrainian flag onto each end zone at the MetLife Stadium.

References

External links

1947 births
Living people
20th-century American businesspeople
21st-century American businesspeople
Ambassadors of the United States to the United Kingdom
American chief executives of professional sports organizations
American sports businesspeople
Businesspeople from New Jersey
Businesspeople in the pharmaceutical industry
New Jersey Republicans
New York Jets owners
People from Bedminster, New Jersey
People from New Brunswick, New Jersey
Woody
Sportspeople from Somerset County, New Jersey
Trump administration personnel
University of Arizona alumni
People from Palm Beach, Florida
21st-century American diplomats
Florida Republicans